Deputy Commander Operations is the senior Royal Air Force officer responsible for the conduct of air operations at home and overseas. The current Deputy Commander Operations is Air Marshal Harvey Smyth who has been serving in the position since August 2022.

Previous post-holders
Deputy Commanders-in-Chief (Operations)
Air Marshal Iain McNicoll CB CBE, 26 February 2007 – 13 April 2010 (appointed as DC-in-C Strike Command)
Air Marshal Richard Garwood CB CBE DFC, 14 April 2010 to Spring 2012

Deputy Commanders (Operations)
Air Marshal Richard Garwood CB CBE DFC, Spring 2012 to April 2013
Air Marshal Greg Bagwell CB CBE, 16 April 2013 to June 2016
Air Marshal Stuart Atha CB DSO, June 2016 to May 2019
Air Marshal Sir Gerry Mayhew CBE, May 2019 to August 2022
Air Marshal Harvey Smyth CB, OBE, DFC, August 2022 to present

See also
Deputy Commander Capability

References 

Royal Air Force appointments